Wavrin is a commune in the Nord department in northern France. It was established around the year . It is part of the Métropole Européenne de Lille.

Heraldry

Population

People
Jean de Waurin

See also
Communes of the Nord department

References

Communes of Nord (French department)
French Flanders